The 1940 Chicago Cardinals season was their 21st in the league. The team improved on their previous output of 1–10, winning two games. They failed to qualify for the playoffs for the 15th consecutive season.

Schedule

Note: Intra-division opponents are in bold text.

Standings

References

1940
Chicago Cardinals
Chicago